Arnold S. Naudain House is a historic home located near Middletown, New Castle County, Delaware.  It was built about 1725, and is a -story, five bay, stuccoed brick dwelling in the early Georgian style.  It has a hipped roof and two-story stuccoed brick wing. Also on the property is a contributing ice house.

It was listed on the National Register of Historic Places in 1973. It is on the grounds of St. Andrew's School.

References

External links

Historic American Buildings Survey in Delaware
Houses on the National Register of Historic Places in Delaware
Georgian architecture in Delaware
Houses completed in 1725
Houses in New Castle County, Delaware
1725 establishments in Delaware
National Register of Historic Places in New Castle County, Delaware